Honoré Lechasseur is one of two main characters in the Doctor Who spin-off Time Hunter series published by Telos Publishing Ltd. He is a time sensitive, which means that he possess the ability to see into people's pasts and futures when he is in their vicinity. He is also able to physically travel along people's timelines when he is working with a time channeller, such as his friend Emily Blandish. Honoré has appeared on some of the covers of the Time Hunter novellas.

Overview 
The character was created by Daniel O'Mahony for the Telos Doctor Who novella The Cabinet of Light. Shortly after the novella was published it was announced that BBC Enterprises would not be renewing Telos's licence to produce Doctor Who novellas. Telos subsequently announced that they would begin producing a series of "Part mystery, part detective story, part dark fantasy, part science fiction"  novellas that would continue the spirit of the Doctor Who novellas. This was the Time Hunter range, which continued the adventures of Honoré and Emily Blandish.

Honoré is portrayed as a moral character – he prides himself on never having swindled any of his customers – who develops from struggling to understand and live with his abilities, to embracing them through his platonic relationship with Emily Blandish. Through the novellas, he progresses from using alcohol on a regular basis as a "painkiller", to eventually becoming teetotal.

The character continued in the Time Hunter range for 11 novellas, before Telos announced that the range was to be closed due to poor sales.

Biography 

Honoré Lechasseur in an American from New Orleans, Louisiana, who came to Europe whilst serving in the US Army in World War II. His platoon were moving through France when they became lost and ended up in Belgium, finding a farmhouse that had recently been abandoned by German soldiers. The group settled down to enjoy a stash of alcohol that had been left behind, and Honoré's Lieutenant began to play a piano: the piano had been booby trapped with explosives, and the Lieutenant was killed.

Honoré suffered physical injuries in the explosion and was advised by Army medics that he would never walk again. He also suffered psychological injuries from the trauma, made worse by the knowledge that of his entire platoon, Honoré was the only other person who could play the piano and so if it had not been his lieutenant who had been killed, it might well have been Honoré himself.

Honoré was moved to a hospital in England in 1943, where he began to recover the use of his legs. During this period, he also began to develop an ability to see people's pasts and futures that he later learnt was called time sensitivity.

Whilst in hospital, Honoré was treated by a small bearded Scots doctor (recalling the Seventh Doctor, although it is unclear whether the character is intended to actually be the Seventh Doctor in disguise) who helped him recover to a certain degree. Honoré then left the hospital and relocated to Shoreditch in London, where he began working as a black market spiv – although he preferred the term "fixer".

In 1949, Honoré was hired by a woman posing as Emily Blandish to find her "husband", the Doctor. During the course of his investigations, Honoré met a young amnesiac woman dubbed "the girl in the pink pyjamas" by the press, and together they help save the Cabinet of Light (in actuality, the TARDIS) from a Nazi cult desperate to possess it for their own ends. He also helped the girl to remember her real name: Emily Blandish.

Following this adventure, Emily and Honoré kept in touch and built a strong, platonic relationship. It was not until they both happened to spot the same man at the same time and wonder where he had come from, however, that they realised that Emily was a time sensitive. They both travelled forwards in time to an alternative 1984 (based on the novel by George Orwell), where they spent time trying to work out how to get back to their own time – which they ultimately did, whilst also ensuring that the future they had witnessed never came about.

Honoré and Emily eventually came to understand how they had travelled through time, and became so practised at it that they could soon travel at will to a chosen date and time. They faced various adventures together, during which they fought the Fendahl and gained the enmity of a mysterious time travelling cult.

At present, Honoré's ultimate destiny is unknown.

External links 
 Telos website
 Outpost Gallifrey's "Cabinet of Light" section
 Doctor Who Ratings Guide reviews

Literary characters introduced in 2003
Doctor Who book characters
Fictional spivs
Male characters in literature
Time Hunter